Brobdingnagia is a genus of fungi in the family Phyllachoraceae.

References

External links
Index Fungorum

Sordariomycetes genera
Phyllachorales